Raphael Hayyim Isaac Carregal (October 15, 1733, Hebron, Ottoman Empire – May 5, 1777, Barbados) was an itinerant Palestinian rabbi and preacher. He is the first rabbi known to have visited the colonies that became the United States.

Biography
Carregal refers to David Melammed as his teacher. He was an ordained rabbi at the age of seventeen, and in 1754 set out on a series of voyages, usually remaining a brief time in the places he visited; e.g., two years in Constantinople (1754–56); two years in Curaçao, (1761–63); four years in Hebron (1764–68); two and a half years in London (1768–71); one year in Jamaica (1771–72); and one year in the British colonies of North America (1772–73). On July 21, 1773 he sailed for Suriname, and in 1775 he was at Barbados. In London, according to his own statement, he was teacher at the Bet ha-midrash, earning a salary of £100 per annum. At Curaçao, he appears to have held the office of rabbi, though no record of his incumbency is to be found in local annals. He spent some time in New York City and Philadelphia, and sojourned in Newport, Rhode Island (March–July 1773), as the guest of the community. Though not connected with the congregation, he often officiated at divine service, preaching in Spanish.

While in Newport, Carregal became an intimate friend of Ezra Stiles, afterward president of Yale College. They studied together, discussing the exegesis and interpretation of Messianic passages in the Bible, and corresponded, mostly in Hebrew. The letters still exist among the unpublished Stiles papers in the library of Yale University.  Stiles also took advantage of the opportunity to improve his basic skills in the Hebrew language, feeling (as did many scholars of divinity in the period) that this was advantageous for study of the ancient Biblical texts in their original language.  Stiles, in his diary, speaks lovingly and admiringly of his Jewish friend; gives a long account of his dress, manner, and personality; and, in a series of entries occupying many pages, draws up a complete memoir of his career in Newport.  Stiles commissioned a portrait of Carigal by artist Samuel King for Yale.

Stiles describes Carigal at the March, 1773 Purim service at the Newport synagogue as:

"dressed in a red garment with the usual Phylacteries and habiliments, the white silk Surplice; he wore a high fur cap, had a long beard. He has the appearance of an ingenious and sensible man"

and at the Passover services the next month as wearing:

"    "a high Fur Cap, exactly like a Womans Muff, and about 9 or 10 Inches high, the Aperture atop was closed with green cloth",

and singing in a "fine and melodious" voice. Thus impressed by Carigal, Stiles invited him and Aaron Lopez, a respected local Jewish merchant, to his home on March 30, 1773. The two immediately hit it off; according to Stiles' records they met 28 times before Carigal's departure six months later, to discuss a wide variety of topics ranging from the politics of the Holy Land to the mysticism of the Kabbalah. Carigal also tutored Stiles in the Hebrew language, to the point that they were to correspond extensively in Hebrew after Carigal's departure.

Carregal appears to have written only two brochures (both sermons), published in Newport in 1773. The published sermons are the first Jewish sermons published in the United States.

Notes

References
Abiel Holmes, Life of Ezra Stiles, Boston, 1798
Hannah Adams, History of the Jews, London ed., 1818
Publications of the American Jewish Historical Society, No. 3, pp. 122–125; No. 6, p. 79; No. 8, pp. 119–126
The Literary Diary of Ezra Stiles, edited by F.B. Dexter,  New York, 1901
G.A. Kohut, Ezra Stiles and the Jews, New York, 1902
Yosef Goldman, Hebrew Printing in America, New York, 2006

External links
 The Rabbis and Ezra Stiles by Arthur A. Chiel
 The Rabbi from Hebron and the President of Yale

Ezra Stiles and the Jews; selected passages from his Literary diary concerning Jews and Judaism
 The Chacham for the Colonies
 How Hebrew Came to Yale
 The Rabbis and the Reverend Ezra Stiles

1733 births
1777 deaths
Rabbis in Hebron
Sephardi rabbis in Ottoman Palestine
18th-century rabbis from the Ottoman Empire
Barbadian Jews